Kerouac: Kicks Joy Darkness is a 1997 spoken word tribute album released through Rykodisc featuring late Beat Generation writer Jack Kerouac's work performed by various artists. Notable performers include: Michael Stipe, Allen Ginsberg, Hunter S. Thompson, Johnny Depp, and Patti Smith. Seven out of the twenty-five tracks are strictly spoken word pieces, while the rest feature music.

Background
Kerouac: Kicks Joy Darkness was produced by Jim Sampas, a musician in Boston-area bands, whose aunt was married to Jack Kerouac. Sonic Youth's Lee Ranaldo was brought on board as associate producer, and he enlisted Thurston Moore, Eddie Vedder, Michael Stipe, and others to the project. Sampas said of the Kerouac work chosen for the album, "The mainstream books are more appealing, more accessible, but we wanted to do things people hadn't heard before, open people's eyes to work never published before." Through literary executor John Sampas, previously unpublished material was made available. 

The album contains two tracks not written by Kerouac: album opener "Kerouac," performed by rock band Morphine, and "Letter to William S. Burroughs" / "Ode to Jack," in which gonzo-journalist Hunter S. Thompson departs from Kerouac's text to recite his own "Ode to Jack."

Poets Allen Ginsberg and Lawrence Ferlinghetti were recorded live at the New York University Kerouac tribute at Town Hall in 1995. Ginsberg's performance of "The Brooklyn Bridge Blues" is missing the final tenth chorus. This was due to a faxing machine error which stuck the last pages together when Ginsberg was faxed the lyrics. The final chorus is read by musician Eric Andersen instead, recorded on a DAT recorder from the Brooklyn Bridge. Singer Patti Smith's performance with guitarists Thurston Moore and Lenny Kaye was recorded live at the Lowell Celebrates Kerouac Festival in 1995.

Former Clash frontman Joe Strummer was sent a recording from the late 1950s of Kerouac talking at a poetry reading. Because a jukebox in the background was playing Frank Sinatra, Strummer was asked to cover up the audible Sinatra music. "So I laid in the music behind Kerouac as best I could," Strummer said, "but I could still hear Frank going, "Come fly with me." So I had to invent this absurd kind of hyena-cum-Shangri-Las "oooo-ahhh" backing part to pop in at obtuse moments to cover Frank whenever he happened to bleed onto Kerouac's recording."

The majority of the texts are taken from Pomes All Sizes (1992), except "Letter to William S. Burroughs" and "Letter to John Clellon Holmes," which are from Jack Kerouac: Selected Letters, Vol. 1, 1940–1956 (1995), "MacDougal Street Blues" is from Book of Blues (1995), and "Madroad Driving..." and "Have You Ever Seen Anyone Like Cody Pomeray?" are from Visions of Cody (1972). "Dream: "Us Kids Swim off a Gray Pier...", "America's New Trinity of Love: Dean, Brando, Presley", "Dream: "On a Sunny Afternoon...", and "The Brooklyn Bridge Blues" are previously unpublished.

Critical reception

William Ruhlmann, writing for AllMusic, wrote in his review: "Kerouac was not a fan of rock music, instead preferring bebop jazz, so the closest tracks to what he himself would have preferred are associate producer and Sonic Youth member Lee Ranaldo's excerpt from a letter to John Clellon Holmes, accompanied by saxophonist Dana Colley, Warren Zevon's "Running Through – Chinese Poem Song," accompanied by pianist Michael Wolff, and Matt Dillon's "Mexican Loneliness," with a jazzy sax and bongo accompaniment ... The selections present a good sampling of Kerouac's literary concerns, and, whether appropriate or not, the recordings demonstrate his extensive influence."

Track listing

Personnel
Adapted from the album liner notes.

Morphine – "Kerouac"
Mark Sandman – vocals, recording, mixing
Billy Conway – drums
Recorded and mixed at Hi-N-Dry, Cambridge, MA.

Lydia Lunch – "Bowery Blues"
Lydia Lunch – vocals, recording

Michael Stipe – "My Gang"
Michael Stipe – vocals, organ
Tom Lewis – recording, mixing
Recorded and mixed at Rockit Studios, Athens, GA.

Steven Tyler – "Dream: "Us Kids Swim off a Gray Pier..."
Steven Tyler – vocals, a cappella background vocals
Kevin Shirley – recording, mixing
Rory Romano – assistant engineer
Recorded and mixed at Avatar Studios, New York City, NY.

Hunter S. Thompson – "Letter to William S. Burroughs" / "Ode to Jack"
Hunter S. Thompson – vocals
Recorded October 18, 1996, Woody Creek, CO.

Maggie Estep and the Spitters –	"Skid Row Wine"
Maggie Estep – vocals
Mark Ashwill – vocals
Tim Bradlee – guitar
Bill Bronson – bass
Louis Echavarria – drums
Ingo Krauss – recording, mixing 
Roy Mayorga – recording, mixing
Sal Mormando – assistant engineer
Recorded and mixed at Harold Dessau Studios, New York City, NY.

Richard Lewis –	"America's New Trinity Of Love: Dean, Brando, Presley"
Richard Lewis – vocals
Daniel Messerli – recording, mixing
Recorded and mixed in Los Angeles, CA

Lawrence Ferlinghetti and Helium – "Dream: "On a Sunny Afternoon..."
Lawrence Ferlinghetti – vocals
Mary Timony – vocals, keyboards, xylophone, mixing 
Ash Bowie – guitar
Shawn Devlin – percussion
Dan McLaughlin – recording (Helium), mixing
Owen Burkett – recording (Helium)
Ann Pope – recording (Helium)
David Cook – recording (Lawrence Ferlinghetti)
Jim Sampas – mixing
Recorded on June 6, 1995, Town Hall, New York City, by Nevessa Productions Mobile Recording Studio. Helium recorded and mixed at Fort Apache, Cambridge, MA.

Jack Kerouac and Joe Strummer – "MacDougal Street Blues"
Jack Kerouac – vocals
Joe Strummer – synthesizer, guitar, bass, recording (music), mixing
Richard Norris – drum machine
Recorded in New York City circa late 1950s. Music recorded and mixed in The Woodshed, Heckfield, England.

Allen Ginsberg – "Brooklyn Bridge Blues" (choruses 1-9)
Allen Ginsberg – vocals
David Cook – recording
Chris Anderson – mixing
Jim Sampas – mixing
Recorded on June 6, 1995, Town Hall, New York City, by Nevessa Productions Mobile Recording Studio. Mixed at Nevessa, Woodstock, NY.

Eddie Vedder, Campbell 2000 and Sadie 7 – "Hymn"
Eddie Vedder – vocals
Campbell 2000 – guitar
Sadie 7 – bass
13 Anthony – recording, mixing
Recorded and mixed in Seattle, WA.

William S. Burroughs and Tomandandy – "Old Western Movies"
William Burroughs – vocals
Tom Hajdu – keyboards
Andy Milburn – keyboards
James Liebow – guitar 
John Patatucci – double bass
Gil Goldstein – accordion
Bashiri Johnson – percussion
John Arrucci – percussion
Brian Smith – recording, mixing
Jerry Gottus – recording, mixing

Juliana Hatfield – "Silly Goofball Pomes"
Juliana Hatfield – vocals
Gregory Hormel – guitar
David Cook – recording, mixing
Recorded and mixed at Fort Apache, Cambridge, MA.John Cale – "The Moon"John Cale – vocals, keyboards, recording, mixing
Recorded and mixed at John Cale's recording studio in Greenwich Village, New York City, NY.Johnny Depp and Come – "Madroad Driving..."
Johnny Depp – vocals
Thalia Zedek – guitar, clarinet, vibraslap
Chris Brokaw – guitar, Marxophone
Tara Jane O'Neil – bass (special guest) 
Kevin Coultas – drums, percussion (special guest)
Bruce Witkin – recording, mixing (Johnny Depp)
Tim O'Heir – recording, mixing (Come)
Recorded and mixed at The Garage, Los Angeles, CA. Come recorded and mixed at Fort Apache, Cambridge, MA.

Robert Hunter –	"Have You Ever Seen Anyone Like Cody Pomeray?..."
Robert Hunter – vocals, recording
Jack Kerouac – background scat singing (playing on cassette player)
Recorded on the road.

Lee Ranaldo and Dana Colley – "Letter to John Clellon Holmes"
Lee Ranaldo – vocals, tapes
Dana Colley – saxophone, mixing
Pete Weiss – recording, mixing 
Jim Sampas – mixing
Recorded at Pete Weiss' apartment in Brookline, MA. Mixed at Zippah Studios, Brookline, MA.

Anna Domino – "Pome on Doctor Sax"
Anna Domino – vocals, keyboards, recording
Recorded and mixed at Light of Day Studios, New York City, NY.

Rob Buck and Danny Chauvin – "Mexico Rooftop"
Danny Chauvin – vocals
Rob Buck – guitar
Tony White – saxophone
Recorded at Avalon Studios, Long Island, NY.

Patti Smith with Thurston Moore and Lenny Kaye – "The Last Hotel"
Patti Smith – vocals, guitar
Thurston Moore – guitar
Lenny Kaye – guitar
Lonnie Bedell – recording, mixing
Recorded and mixed at the Lowell Celebrates Kerouac Festival 1995, the Smith Baker Center, Lowell, MA.

Warren Zevon and Michael Wolff – "Running Through–Chinese Poem Song"
Warren Zevon – vocals
Michael Wolff – piano
Duncan Aldrich – recording
Recorded at Pollywood Studios, Hollywood, CA.

Jim Carroll with Lee Ranaldo, Lenny Kaye and Anton Sanko – "Woman"
Jim Carroll – vocals
Lee Ranaldo – guitar
Lenny Kaye – guitar
Anton Sanko – keyboards
Warton Tears – recording, mixing
Recorded and mixed at Fun City, New York City, NY.

Matt Dillon with Joey Altruda, Joe Gonzalez and Pablo Calogero – "Mexican Loneliness"
Matt Dillon – vocals
Joey Altruda – bass
Pablo Calogero – saxophone
Joe Gonzalez – percussion
Danny Caccavo – recording, mixing
Recorded and mixed at This Way Studios, New York City, NY.

Inger Lorre and Jeff Buckley – "Angel Mine"
Inger Lorre – vocals, guitar, keyboards
Jeff Buckley – guitar, sitar, mouth saxophone
Hillary Johnson – recording, mixing
Recorded and mixed at Spa Recording Studios, New York City, NY.

Eric Andersen – "Brooklyn Bridge Blues" (chorus 10)
Eric Andersen – vocals, recording
Recorded on the Brooklyn Bridge, New York City, NY.

Technical
Jim Sampas – producer  
Lee Ranaldo – associate producer
Danny Caccavo – mastering
Allen Ginsberg – photography 
Barbara Longo – package design

References

1997 albums
Tribute albums to non-musicians
Jack Kerouac
Rykodisc albums